The Cordenio Severance House is a mansion in Cottage Grove, Minnesota, United States, built for attorney Cordenio Severance (1862–1925). The mansion, also known as Cedarhurst, was first built as a simple country farm house shortly after the American Civil War. It was expanded in 1886 to serve as the summer residence of the Severance family. The Cordenio Severance House was listed on the National Register of Historic Places in 1976 for its local significance in the themes of architecture and law. It was nominated for its association with Cordenio Severance, a leading attorney in Saint Paul, Minnesota, from 1887 to the 1920s, and for being an example of a grand country estate. The mansion now serves as an event venue.

Description
The Cordenio Severance House has two Neoclassical columned porticos, a  veranda, a formal ballroom with a pipe organ, three fireplaces, and an English rose garden.

History
Cordenio Severance was well-connected politically.  Presidents Theodore Roosevelt, Warren G. Harding, Calvin Coolidge, and William Howard Taft all visited the mansion, and Central Intelligence Agency meetings were once held in the library.  The mansion also hosted international policy meetings.

The house is now owned by True Thao and his family.  They have restored the mansion, which hosts weddings, receptions, and business meetings.

See also
 National Register of Historic Places listings in Washington County, Minnesota

References

External links

 Cedarhurst Mansion

Cass Gilbert buildings
Houses completed in 1917
Houses in Washington County, Minnesota
Houses on the National Register of Historic Places in Minnesota
Italianate architecture in Minnesota
National Register of Historic Places in Washington County, Minnesota
Neoclassical architecture in Minnesota